Niyazi Öktem (born 1944) is a Turkish academic. Born in Elazığ, he is a professor of Public Law, Philosophy of Law, and Sociology of Law in the Faculty of Law at Istanbul Bilgi University. He is president of the Intercultural Dialogue Platform, the most prominent inter-faith organisation in Turkey.

Books 
 Özgürlük Sorunu ve Hukuk (1977)
 Fenomonoloji ve Hukuk (1981)
 Hukuk Felsefesi ve Hukuk Sosyolojisi (1988)
 Sosyolojinin ve Felsefenin Verileriyle Devlet ve Hukuk Felsefesi Akımları (1993)
 Hallac-ı Mansur (1994)
 Din, Laiklik, Alevilik Yazıları (1995)
 Felsefe Sosyoloji, Hukuk ve Devlet (1999)
 Diyalog Yazıları (2001)
 Galatasaraylı Monsenyör (2001)
 Çağımız Hristiyan-Müslüman Diyalog Önderleri (2013)

References

Turkish non-fiction writers
Turkish sociologists
Turkish legal scholars
Istanbul University Faculty of Law alumni
Academic staff of Istanbul Bilgi University
Living people
1944 births
People from Elazığ
Date of birth missing (living people)